Byron Barton (born 1930) is a creator of children's picture books. His works have received six ALA Notable Book Awards, five SLJ Best Books of the Year selections, and two Reading Rainbow picks.

Prior to working in children's literature, Barton was an animator for CBS.

References

1930 births
Living people
American children's writers
American illustrators